A stonecutter is a person who carries on the trade of stonecutting or stonemasonry.

Stonecutter or Stonecutters may also refer to:

 Chainsaw (section Cutting stone, concrete and brick)

Books
 Stonecutter, one of twelve magical Swords in the Books of the Swords series
 The Stonecutter, a Japanese folktale about a man who wished he was the sun
 The Stone Cutter, a novel by Camilla Läckberg
 Stonecutter (comics), a Marvel Comics supervillain

Film and television
 The Stonecutters, a fictional secret society from The Simpsons episode "Homer the Great"
 Stenhuggaren, also known as The Stonecutter, 2009 film by Emiliano Goessens, adapted from The Stone Cutter by Camilla Läckberg

Geography
 Stonecutters Bridge, Hong Kong
 Stonecutters Island, in Victoria Harbour, Hong Kong

Music
 "Stonecutter", a song by James Keelaghan from Home (2001)
 "Stonecutter", a song by Preston Reed from Metal (1995)
 "Stonecutters", an instrumental by Flying Lotus from The Music of Grand Theft Auto V (2013)
 "We Do", also known as "We Do (The Stonecutters' Song)", a song from The Simpsons episode "Homer the Great"